The 2015 WNBA All-Star Game is an exhibition basketball game. It was played on July 25, 2015. The Connecticut Sun hosted a WNBA All-Star Game for the fourth time. The Sun previously hosted the game in 2005, 2009, and 2013.

Starters for the game were selected by fan voting. Fans were able to select three frontcourt players and two guards. Elena Delle Donne of the Chicago Sky led voting with 18,034 votes. Maya Moore won the MVP of the All-Star game and led the Western Conference to a 117-112 victory over the Eastern Conference.

Coaches
Coaches were determined by the previous year's conference championships. Sandy Brondello, coach of the defending WNBA and West champion Phoenix Mercury coached the Western Conference, while Pokey Chatman, coach of the defending East champion Chicago Sky, coached the East. It was the first time coaching the All-Star Game for both coaches.

Players

Eastern Conference
In addition to Elena Delle Donne, Shoni Schimmel of the Atlanta Dream were voted as backcourt starters for the East, with Angel McCoughtry of the Dream, Tamika Catchings of the Fever, and Tina Charles of the New York Liberty as frontcourt starters.

Reserves included Stefanie Dolson  and Emma Meesseman of the Washington Mystics, Cappie Pondexter of the Chicago Sky, Alex Bentley and Kelsey Bone of the Sun, and Marissa Coleman of the Fever.

Western Conference
Guard Skylar Diggins of the Tulsa Shock was the top vote getter in the West, and was joined in the backcourt by Seimone Augustus of the Minnesota Lynx. Starting frontcourt for the West were Maya Moore of the Minnesota Lynx, Brittney Griner and Candice Dupree of the Phoenix Mercury. Both Diggins and Augustus were unable to play due to a knee injury, and was replaced in the starting lineup by Sue Bird of the Storm and DeWanna Bonner of the Mercury respectively.

Reserves included Lindsay Whalen of the Lynx, Nneka Ogwumike of the Sparks, Plenette Pierson of the Tulsa Shock, and Danielle Robinson of the San Antonio Stars. Whalen was unable to play due to an eye injury, and Jantel Lavender of the Sparks, Kayla McBride of the Stars, and Riquna Williams of the Shock were named as an injury replacement for Diggins, Augustus, and Whalen respectively.

Rosters

Notes
INJ  Injured
ST   Starting in place of injured player
REP  Injury replacement

Game

References

2015 WNBA season
Women's National Basketball Association All-Star Game